Abdur Razzaq (1 August 1942 – 23 December 2011) was a Bangladeshi politician and member of the Awami League Advisory Council. He was the Minister for Water Resources from 1996 to 2001 in the first Sheikh Hasina Cabinet. He was the chairman of the Parliamentary Standing Committee for the Water Resources Ministry.

Early life and education
Razzaq was born into a middle class business family of South Damudya village under Damudya Upazila of Shariatpur District in the province of Bengal (now Bangladesh) to father Alhaj Imamuddin and mother Begum Akfatun Nesa. His childhood dream was to develop his village into an ideal village where everyone would prosper and be solvent.

Razzaq passed his Secondary School Certificate examination from Damudya Muslim High School in 1958 and Higher Secondary School Certificate examination from Dhaka College in 1960, he then enrolled at University of Dhaka and passed the BA (Honors) in political science and in 1964 he enrolled and passed the MA in political science. Later he passed LLB and enrolled as a lawyer in 1973.

Razzaq married Farida Razzaq in 1973 and is the father of Nahim Razzaq and Fahim Razzaq.

Political career
Razzaq started his political career in student life being elected as the secretary of Fazlul Haq Hall Students Union, Dhaka University in 1963. A versatile charismatic leader with dynamic organising capacity Razzaq emerged as a popular parliamentarian, and took over the responsibilities of different ministries of the Government of Bangladesh.

Razzaq was the member of the Provincial Assembly in 1970 and elected member of the parliament of the independent Bangladesh in 1973, 1991, 1996, 2001 and 2008. In 9th parliamentary election Razzaq was elected Member of Parliament from Shariatpur-3 (Bhedarganj-Damudya-Gosairhat) constituency getting 102,925 votes while his nearest rival K M Hemayet Ullah Awrangajeb of BNP got 52,672 votes.
Chronology of Razzaq's political career:
 1959–1960: Student union executive member.
 1960–1962: Central Member of East Pakistan Students League.
 1962–1963: Unopposed Assistant General Secretary of Fazlul Huq Hall (University of Dhaka).
 1963–1965: Assistant Joint Secretary (AGS) of Bangladesh Chhatra League and also the elected General Secretary of Fazlul Huq Hall Students Union.
 1965–1967: General Secretary of Bangladesh Chhatra League for two terms.
 1969–1972: Chief of Awami Volunteer Core.
 1972–1975: Organizing Secretary of Bangladesh Awami League.
 1975–1978: Secretary of BAKSAL.
 1978–1981: Secretary-General of Bangladesh Awami League.
 1983–1991: General Secretary of BAKSAL.
 1991–2008: Presidium member of Bangladesh Awami League.
 2008–2009: Member of Advisory council of Bangladesh Awami League.

Contribution in Liberation War 1971
Razzaq was the sector commander of Meghaloy (one of four sector commanders of Mujib Bahini) during the Liberation War of Bangladesh in 1971. He was also an organiser and trainer of Mujib Bahini and was trained in Dehradun by General Uban of the Indian Army. Mujib Bahini or Bangladesh Liberation Force (BLF) was formed to oppose the Pakistani armed forces.

Imprisonment
Razzaq was arrested many times and jailed as a political prisoner. The first time he was sent to jail during 1964–65 by Ayub Khan Government where he appeared his masters examination. Later he was imprisoned from 1967 to 1969 for participating in the 6-Point Movement. After the Liberation War '71, during the Military Coup and the Assassination of Sheikh Mujibur Rahman in 1975 to 1978; Razzaq was yet again arrested along with several other followers of Sheikh Mujibur Rahman. During Ershad regime he was also imprisoned in 1987.

Achievements
 Struggle for the establishment of Six point movement during Pakistani regime.
 One of the leading organizers of liberation war and participating liberation war.
 As a minister of water resource 1996–2001, signing of Sharing of Ganges Waters Treaty between Bangladesh & India.
 Led a 10-member parliamentary team's fact-finding mission on Tipaimukh Dam project and visited India during July–August 2009. On return from India, Razzaq presented a report to the parliament where he said that the Indian ministers had assured them that they would not implement any project to harm Bangladesh.

Death
Razzaq died from kidney and liver damage on 23 December 2011 in London.

References

1942 births
2011 deaths
University of Dhaka alumni
Dhaka College alumni
Awami League politicians
8th Jatiya Sangsad members
5th Jatiya Sangsad members
7th Jatiya Sangsad members
Bangladesh Krishak Sramik Awami League executive committee members
Bangladesh Krishak Sramik Awami League central committee members